Milwaukee Road Depot can refer to the following former and active train stations used by the Chicago, Milwaukee, St. Paul and Pacific Railroad:

Idaho 

 Avery Depot – located on the mainline from Chicago, Illinois to Tacoma, Washington

Iowa 

 Albert City Depot – located on a branch line from Des Moines, Iowa to Spencer, Iowa
 Calmar Passenger Depot – located on the line from Madison, Wisconsin to Rapid City, South Dakota
 Charles City Depot – located on the line from Madison, Wisconsin to Rapid City, South Dakota
 Clear Lake Depot – located on the line from Madison, Wisconsin to Rapid City, South Dakota
 Davenport Freighthouse – located on the mainline from Chicago, Illinois to Kansas City, Missouri
 Decorah Combination Depot – located on a branch line from Conover to Decorah
 Delmar Depot – located on the mainline from Chicago, Illinois to Omaha, Nebraska
 Fayette Depot – located on the line from Jackson Junction to Monticello
 Grafton Depot - located on the line from Mason City to Austin, Minnesota
 Hornick Combination Depot – located along the abandoned Sioux City Branch that operated from 1887 to 1980. It has been converted into a museum.
 Jefferson Depot - located on the line from Spirit Lake to Des Moines
 La Motte Depot – located on the line from Bellevue to Cascade
 Mason City Depot – located on the line from Madison, Wisconsin to Rapid City, South Dakota
 New Albin Depot – located on the line from La Crescent, Minnesota to Davenport, Iowa
 Preston Depot – located on the line from Elk River Junction to Delmar
Spirit Lake Depot – located along U.S. Highway 71/Iowa Highway 9 where the Milwaukee Road line from Spirit Lake, Iowa to Spencer, Iowa sat between 1883 and 1972. It is now used as the Dickinson County Museum.

Illinois 

 Bartlett Station – located on the suburban line from Chicago, Illinois to Elgin, Illinois
 Cedar Point Depot - located on the line between Davis Junction and Oglesby 
 Deerfield Station – located on the mainline from Chicago, Illinois to Milwaukee, Wisconsin
 Durand Depot - located on the line from Racine, Wisconsin to Kitteredge, Illinois
 Freeport Depot - located on the line from Racine, Wisconsin to Kitteredge, Illinois
 Fulton Depot - located on the secondary line from Savanna, Illinois to Moline, Illinois.
 Mendota Station - located on the line between Davis Junction and Oglesby which was abandoned in 1980.
 Moline Depot - located on the secondary line from Savanna, Illinois to Moline, Illinois.
 Rock City Depot - located on the line from Racine, Wisconsin to Kitteredge, Illinois

Michigan 

 Amasa Depot
 Channing Depot
 Iron Mountain Depot
 Iron River Depot – located on a branch line from Kelso Junction (near Channing, Michigan) to the terminus at Iron River, Michigan
 Menominee Depot – the terminus of the branch line from Crivitz, Wisconsin to Menominee, Michigan
 Ontonagon Depot
 Randville Depot

Minnesota

In Use

 Red Wing Station – located on the mainline from Chicago to Tacoma, Washington
 Winona Station – located on the mainline from Chicago to Tacoma, Washington

No Longer In Use

 Albert Lea Depot – located on the mainline from Milwaukee, Wisconsin to Madison, South Dakota
 Alpha Depot – located on the line from La Crosse, Wisconsin to Wessington Springs, South Dakota
 Austin Passenger Depot – located on a branch line from Madison, Wisconsin to Austin, Minnesota
 Bixby Depot – located on the line from Farmington to Ramsey
 Brownsdale Depot – located on the line from La Crosse, Wisconsin to Wessington Springs, South Dakota
 Brownsville Depot – located on the line from La Crescent to Davenport, Iowa
 Canton Depot – located on the line from Reno to Isinours
 Chaska Depot – located on the line from Farmington to Cologne
 Clinton Depot – located on a branch line from Ortonville, Minnesota to Fargo, North Dakota
 Dexter Depot – located on the line from La Crosse, Wisconsin to Wessington Springs, South Dakota
 Dresbach Depot – located on the mainline from Chicago, Illinois to Tacoma, Washington
 Faribault Depot – located on the line from Farmington to Ramsey
 Farmington Depot – located at the junction of multiple lines
 Fulda Depot – located on the line from La Crosse, Wisconsin to Wessington Springs, South Dakota
 Granada Depot – located on the line from La Crosse, Wisconsin to Wessington Springs, South Dakota
 Granite Falls Depot – located on the mainline from Chicago, Illinois to Tacoma, Washington
 Harmony Depot – located on the line from Reno to Isinours
 Hastings Depot – located on the mainline from Chicago, Illinois to Tacoma, Washington
 Huntley Depot – located on the line from La Crosse, Wisconsin to Wessington Springs, South Dakota
 Jackson Depot – located on the line from La Crosse, Wisconsin to Wessington Springs, South Dakota
 La Crescent Depot – located at the junction of the line from La Crosse, Wisconsin to Wessington Springs, South Dakota, and the line from La Crescent to Davenport, Iowa
 Le Center Depot – located on the line from Farmington to Wells
 Minneapolis Depot – located on the mainline from Chicago, Illinois to Tacoma, Washington
 Montevideo Depot – located on the mainline from Chicago, Illinois to Tacoma, Washington
 Northfield Depot – located on the line from Farmington to Ramsey
 Peterson Depot – located on the line from La Crosse, Wisconsin to Wessington Springs, South Dakota
 Prosper Depot – located on the line from Reno to Isinours
 Rapidan Depot – located on the line from Farmington to Wells
 Rushford Depot – located on the line from La Crosse, Wisconsin to Wessington Springs, South Dakota
 St. Louis Park Depot – located on the mainline from Chicago, Illinois to Tacoma, Washington
 Spring Grove Depot – located on the line from Reno to Isinours
 Vermillion Depot – located on the line from Hastings to Farmington
 Wanamingo Depot – located on the line from Faribault to Zumbrota
 Whalan Depot – located on the line from La Crosse, Wisconsin to Wessington Springs, South Dakota
 Wheaton Depot - located on a branch line from Ortonville, Minnesota to Fargo, North Dakota
 Welcome Depot – located on the line from La Crosse, Wisconsin to Wessington Springs, South Dakota
 Wells Depot and Lunchroom – a junction located on the mainline from Milwaukee, Wisconsin to Madison, South Dakota and the branch line from Wells, Minnesota to Farmington, Minnesota
 Wirock Depot – located on the line from La Crosse, Wisconsin to Wessington Springs, South Dakota

Montana 

 Alberton Depot – located on the mainline from Chicago, Illinois to Tacoma, Washington
 Butte Depot - located on the mainline from Chicago, Illinois to Tacoma, Washington
 Geraldine Depot – located on a branch line from Harlowton, Montana to Great Falls, Montana
 Great Falls Passenger Depot – located on a branch line from Harlowton, Montana to Great Falls, Montana
 Missoula Depot – located on the mainline from Chicago, Illinois to Tacoma, Washington

North Dakota

 Bowman Depot - located on the mainline from Chicago, Illinois to Tacoma, Washington
 Brisbane Depot - located on a branch line from Mclaughlin, South Dakota to New England, North Dakota
 Bucyrus Depot - located on the mainline from Chicago, Illinois to Tacoma, Washington
 Christine Depot - located on a branch line from Ortonville, Minnesota to Fargo, North Dakota
 Elgin Depot - located on a branch line from Mclaughlin, South Dakota to New England, North Dakota
 Ellendale Depot - located on a branch line from Aberdeen, South Dakota to Edgeley, North Dakota
 Fairmount Depot - located on a branch line from Ortonville, Minnesota to Fargo, North Dakota
 Fargo Depot - located on a branch line from Ortonville, Minnesota to Fargo, North Dakota
 Gascoyne Depot - located on the mainline from Chicago, Illinois to Tacoma, Washington
 Haynes Depot - located on the mainline from Chicago, Illinois to Tacoma, Washington
 Hettinger Depot - located on the mainline from Chicago, Illinois to Tacoma, Washington
 Marmarth Depot - located on the mainline from Chicago, Illinois to Tacoma, Washington
 Raleigh Depot - located on a branch line from Mclaughlin, South Dakota to New England, North Dakota
 Reeder Depot - located on the mainline from Chicago, Illinois to Tacoma, Washington
 Scranton Depot - located on the mainline from Chicago, Illinois to Tacoma, Washington
 Selfridge Depot - located on a branch line from Mclaughlin, South Dakota to New England, North Dakota
 Strasburg Depot - located on a branch line from Roscoe, South Dakota to Bismarck, North Dakota

South Dakota 

 Aberdeen Depot a junction located on the mainline from Chicago, Illinois to Tacoma, Washington and the mainline from Sioux City, Iowa to Aberdeen, South Dakota, and where a branch to Edgely diverged.
 Java Depot - located on the mainline from Chicago, Illinois to Tacoma, Washington
 Kadoka Depot – located on the mainline from Milwaukee, Wisconsin to Rapid City, South Dakota
 Madison Depot – a junction located on the mainline from Milwaukee, Wisconsin to Madison, South Dakota and on a branch line from Madison, South Dakota to Bristol, South Dakota
 Morristown Depot - located on the mainline from Chicago, Illinois to Tacoma, Washington
 Rapid City Freighthouse – located on the mainline from Milwaukee, Wisconsin to Rapid City, South Dakota
 Thunder Hawk Depot - located on the mainline from Chicago, Illinois to Tacoma, Washington
 Utica Depot - located on a branch line from Sioux City, Iowa to Mitchell, South Dakota
 Watauga Depot - located on the mainline from Chicago, Illinois to Tacoma, Washington
 Yankton Depot – located on the mainline from Sioux City, Iowa to Aberdeen, South Dakota

Washington 

 Kittias Depot – located on the mainline from Chicago, Illinois to Tacoma, Washington
 South Cle Elum Depot and Yard – located on the mainline from Chicago, Illinois to Tacoma, Washington
 Tacoma Depot

Wisconsin

In Use

 Columbus Station – located on the mainline from Chicago to Tacoma, Washington
 Milwaukee Intermodal Station – located on the mainline from Chicago to Tacoma, Washington
 La Crosse Station – located on the mainline from Chicago to Tacoma, Washington
 Tomah Station – located on the mainline from Chicago to Tacoma, Washington

No Longer In Use

 Arena Depot – located on the mainline from Madison to Rapid City
 Avoca Depot – located on the mainline from Madison to Rapid City
 Beaver Dam Depot - located on the line from Portage to Horicon
 Black Earth Depot – located on the mainline from Madison to Rapid City
 Blue River Depot – located on the mainline from Madison to Rapid City
 Boscobel Depot – located on the mainline from Madison to Rapid City
 Brodhead Depot – located on the line from Janesville to Mineral Point
 Brookfield Depot – located on the mainline from Chicago to Tacoma, Washington
 Cedarburg Depot - located on the mainline from Milwaukee to Ontonagon 
 Darlington Depot – located on the line from Janesville to Mineral Point
 Doylestown Depot – located on the mainline from Chicago to Tacoma, Washington
 Dunbarton Depot – located on the branch line from Gratiot to Shullsburg
 Edgerton Depot - located on the line from Madison to Rondout, Illinois
 Fox Lake Depot - located on the line from Portage to Horicon
 Gotham Depot – located on the branch line from Lone Rock to Richland Center
 Gratiot Depot – located on the line from Janesville to Mineral Point
 Green Bay Depot –  located on the mainline from Chicago to Ontonagon, Michigan
 Hartland Depot – located on the mainline from Chicago to Tacoma, Washington
 Juda Depot – located on the line from Janesville to Mineral Point
 Knowlton Depot – located on the line from New Lisbon to Star Lake
 Madison Depot – located on a branch line from Rondout, Illinois, to Madison, Wisconsin, northern terminus of the line
 Marinette Depot – located on a branch line from Crivitz to Menominee, Michigan
 Mazomanie Depot – located on the mainline from Madison to Rapid City
 Middleton Depot - located on the line from Madison to Rapid City
 Milwaukee Everett Street Depot – demolished, was located on the mainline from Chicago to Milwaukee
 Mineral Point Depot – located on the line from Janesville to Mineral Point
 Monroe Depot – located on the line from Janesville to Mineral Point
 Monticello Depot – located on the line from Janesville to Mineral Point
 Nashota Depot – located on the mainline from Chicago to Tacoma, Washington
 New Glarus Depot - located on the branch line from New Glarus to Brodhead
 New Lisbon Depot – located on the mainline from Chicago to Tacoma, Washington
 Oakdale Depot – located on the mainline from Chicago to Tacoma, Washington
 Oconomowoc Depot – located on the mainline from Chicago to Seattle and Tacoma and the commuter line from Milwaukee to Watertown
 Orfordville Depot – located on the line from Janesville to Mineral Point
 Prairie du Chien Depot – located on the mainline from Madison to Rapid City
 Prairie du Sac Depot – located on the branch line from Mazomanie to Prairie du Sac
 Richland Center Depot - located on a branch line from Lone Rock to Richland Center
 South Wayne Depot – located on the line from Janesville to Mineral Point
 Sturtevant Depot - located on the mainline from Chicago to Tacoma, Washington, relocated to park, new Amtrak depot
 Viroqua Depot - located on a branch line from Sparta to Viroqua
 Walworth Depot - located on the branch line from Rondout, Illinois to Madison, Wisconsin
 Wausau Depot – located on the line from New Lisbon to Star Lake
 Woodman Depot – located on the mainline from Madison to Rapid City